Fox Ridge may refer to:

Fox Ridge, Indiana
Fox Ridge, Maryland
Fox Ridge, South Dakota
Fox Ridge State Park in Illinois